Tommy Haas was the defending champion but lost in the second round to Jürgen Melzer.

Roger Federer won in the final 6–4, 6–1, 3–6, 6–4 against Jiří Novák.

Seeds

  Tommy Haas (second round)
  Juan Carlos Ferrero (second round)
  Albert Costa (first round)
  Carlos Moyá (semifinals)
  Jiří Novák (final)
  Roger Federer (champion)
  Sjeng Schalken (withdrew because of fluid on the knee)
  David Nalbandian (first round)
  Xavier Malisse (first round)

Draw

Final

Section 1

Section 2

External links
 2002 CA-TennisTrophy draw

Vienna Open
2002 ATP Tour